BRCC may refer to:

Companies
Black Rifle Coffee Company

Educational institutions
Baton Rouge Community College a community college in Louisiana, United States
Blue Ridge Community College (Virginia) a community college in Virginia, United States